Simon Blanckley is a British racing driver from Durham and former driver in the British Touring Car Championship. He began racing in 2000 having followed in the footsteps of  his Uncle, John Blanckley ,a World Sportscar Racer and Historic rally Driver.

 

Simon Competed in the Ultra Competitive  2006 Super Touring Car Cup with LMA in an ex Works Honda Accord Super Tourer  run by Graham Hathaway . He  won every race he entered that season bar 1 and totally dominated the Series .

He then moved up to the BTCC in 2007 .,. He raced an ex Team Halfords Honda Integra under the banner of his newly formed Team Sibsport Performance  working with former Independent Champion team owner Graham Hathaway. The Season was a steep learning curve  for Simon , however several top 10 running positions and as high as 6th at his home Circuit of Croft . They scored a point at Rockingham.with a top 10 finish which was a massive achievement for a Privateer Team in a very competitive season .  At Oulton Park he missed race 3 due to accident damage sustained during race 2. At Donington Park he had pace but no results. Before round 8 the team pulled out, due to Blanckley's work commitments.

2008 saw multiple wins in the new Seat Leon Supercopa culminating in races in Spain at the end of the year.

Sibsport then purchased a Porsche 997 GT3 Cup and again many podiums and a Win at Spa in the GT Cup were achieved .

2017 saw Sibsport move to Historics and compete at the Goodwood Revival in an Austin A40  with Matt Neal sharing the drive with Simon . An 8th overall finish was a great effort against more powerful machinery .

Career

 2022 - HRDC Austin A40 - 2 Wins 
 2020- MRL Dolomite Sprint - 2 Class wins 
 2017- HRDC Austin A40 
 2014 - GT Cup - Porsche GT3 Cup
 2013 - GT Cup - Porsche GT3 Cup
 2012 - Team Principal Sibsport Performance Carrera Cup GB 
 2011 - GT Cup - Porsche GT3 Cup 2 Race Wins 
 2009 - Seat Leon Supercopa - 8 race wins 
 2008 - Seat Leon Supercopa - 11 race wins 
 2007- BTCC Honda Integra  Sibsport Performance - independent Cup 
 2006- Euro Saloons- Super Touring Honda Accord- Graham Hathaway Engineering- 6 Race Wins 2 Second  places.,
 2005- Northern Sports & Saloons series - Peugeot 205 numerous Class wins 
 2004- Northern Sports & Saloons series - Peugeot 205
 2003- Northern Sports & Saloons series - Ford Escort

Racing record

Complete British Touring Car Championship results
(key) (Races in bold indicate pole position - 1 point awarded in first race) (Races in italics indicate fastest lap - 1 point awarded all races) (* signifies that driver lead race for at least one lap - 1 point awarded all races)

References

British Touring Car Championship drivers
Living people
Year of birth missing (living people)